Kamenná Poruba may refer to several villages and municipalities in Slovakia:

Kamenná Poruba, Vranov nad Topľou District
Kamenná Poruba, Žilina District